Mehar Chand Bhaskar is a former Indian national weight lifter. He has been awarded the Arjuna Award. He hails from Rajasthan and served in the Indian army. He belongs to Gadakhera village of Buhana Tehsil in Jhunjhunu.

References
An `A' for achievement

Indian male weightlifters
Weightlifters from Rajasthan
Recipients of the Arjuna Award
Living people
Rajasthani people
Military personnel from Rajasthan
Year of birth missing (living people)